Cicindela trifasciata sigmoidea, commonly called the mudflat tiger beetle, is a subspecies of tiger beetle.

References

trifasciata sigmoidea
Beetles of North America
Beetles described in 1982